Hendrik Gerardus Joseph "Joop" Zoetemelk (born 3 December 1946) is a Dutch former professional racing cyclist. He started and finished the Tour de France 16 times, which were both records when he retired. He also holds the distance record in Tour de France history with 62,885 km ridden. He won the 1979 Vuelta a España and the 1980 Tour de France.

He finished the Tour in 8th, 5th, 4th (three times) and 2nd (six times) for a total of eleven top 5 finishes which is also a record. He was the first rider to wear the Tour de France's polka dot jersey as the King of the Mountains and even though he never won this classification in the Tour de France, he did win it in the 1971 Vuelta a España and was considered one of the best climbers of his generation.

If not for a +10:00 doping infraction in 1977, he would have come in the top 5 in each of the first 12 Tours he entered.

He won the World Professional Road Championship in 1985 at the age of 38, with a late attack surprising the favorites of LeMond, Roche, Argentin and Millar. He completed a total of 16 World Championships which is notable considering more than half the field abandons nearly every World Championship and in addition to his win he has come in the top 10 seven other times. As of 2020, he is the oldest men's individual road race world champion.

His record number of starts in the Tour de France was surpassed when George Hincapie started for the 17th time, but Hincapie was disqualified from three tours in October 2012, for doping offenses, giving the number of starts record back to Zoetemelk. Nobody other than Zoetemelk achieved sixteen Tour de France finishes until Sylvain Chavanel did so in the 2018 Tour de France. Currently, three riders have had more than 16 starts in the Tour de France, but no one has yet exceeded the record of finishing the event 16 times. He retired from the sport to run a hotel at Meaux, France.

Early life and career
Zoetemelk was raised in Rijpwetering,  the son of Maria and Gerard Zoetemelk. He started working as a carpenter. He became a speed-skater and a regional champion before turning to cycling in 1964. He joined the Swift club in Leiden and made a fast impression, winning youth races in his first season. He rode particularly well as a senior in multi-day races. He won the Tour of Yugoslavia, the Circuit des Mines, three stages and the mountains prize in the Tour of Austria, and the 1969 Tour de l'Avenir. He also won a gold medal at the 1968 Summer Olympics in Mexico City in the 100 km team time-trial with Fedor den Hertog, Jan Krekels and René Pijnen.

Professional career
Zoetemelk turned professional for Briek Schotte's Belgian Mars–Flandria team in 1970. Initially he was riding in support of team leader Roger De Vlaeminck, but the Belgian abandoned the race due to a crash near the end of the first week. Zoetemelk  proved to be by far the strongest remaining rider on the team. Of his teammates who finished the race the highest placed was 69th, with the majority of others coming in the range of 80th to 100th place. While he admitted that Eddy Merckx was the strongest rider in the world in that year's Tour de France, and was not challenging him for victory, he managed to finish on the podium in 2nd place and was the only rider to finish within 15:00 of Merckx during his first two Tour victories in 1969 and 1970.

He would wear the yellow jersey for the first time in the 1971 Tour de France, following a stage in which he, Luis Ocaña and Bernard Thévenet were able to drop Merckx for the first time. On stage 10 however, Ocaña stole the show in one of the most memorable attacks in Tour history taking the jersey from Zoetemelk and distancing all of the other favorites. On stage 14 Ocaña and Zoetemelk were involved in one of the most famous crashes in Tour history on the Col de Menté. Zoetemelk managed to survive the impact but Ocaña was seriously injured and had to be taken to the hospital. From that point on Merckx would lead the race and Zoetemelk would finish 2nd for the second consecutive year.

He wore the yellow jersey for the second time after winning the Prologue in the 1973 Tour de France, which took place in his home country of the Netherlands. He also picked up another stage win in that year's edition.

Zoetemelk won Paris–Nice, the Semana Catalana and the Tour de Romandie in 1974. He then had a near-death experience during a violent crash, once again involving Luis Ocaña, except this time Zoetemelk had to be taken to the hospital as he crashed heavily into a car left unattended at the finish of the Midi Libre in Valras-Plage, France. He cracked his skull and came close to dying.

He returned the next season to win Paris–Nice again, and then caught meningitis. He never fully recovered and the head injury reduced his sense of taste. Nevertheless, he won 20 races that season, including Paris–Nice, the Tour of Holland and the Dwars door Lausanne and a stage of the Tour de France. He also came fourth in the 1975 Tour de France. During the that year's Tour he won stage 15 and finished strongly overall, placing behind only Thévenet, Merckx and Lucien Van Impe in a Tour where the next closest contenders were close to 20:00 or more behind the winner.

In the 1976 Tour de France he won stage 9 up Alp d'Huez by :03 in a hard-fought climb where he and Van Impe dropped all other riders and were alone crossing the finish. In stage 10 Zoetemelk once again won the stage, this time beating Van Impe and Thévenet by just one second, in the process coming within just seven seconds of the Yellow Jersey. On stage 14 however, Van Impe attacked and for all intents and purposes won the tour. Zoetemelk would win again on Stage 20 but he remained more than 4:00 behind Van Impe as every other rider was more than 12:00 back.

In the 1977 Tour de France he would have the worst Tour placing of his career up to that point, which was partially because he was penalized ten minutes and had a stage win revoked. He still finished in the Top 10 overall.

During the 1978 Tour de France he won stage 14 and going into the stage on Alp d'Huez Zoetemelk, Michel Pollentier and Tour debutant Bernard Hinault were separated from one another by only 0:18. At the end of the stage he led Hinault by +0:14 but was 2nd in the overall classification to Pollentier; however due to the Pollentier doping incident following the post-stage drug test, he took over the yellow jersey. He rode strongly and kept his narrow lead, which he would hold for several stages before losing it to Hinault on the final time trial.

In 1979 he rode the Vuelta a España for the second time in his career. He previously rode the 1971 edition where he placed 6th overall and won the King of the Mountains competition. He would win the 1979 edition.

In the 1979 Tour de France he survived the ‘'hell of the north" cobbles of Roubaix on Stage 9, which is a notorious stage where several riders can get multiple flat tires and there are always many crashes. Zoetemelk survived with four other riders in the winning group, won 3:45 over the next finishers and moved into the yellow jersey, which he would hold for 6 stages. Following the stage 11 time trial it was a two-way battle between him and Hinault and it was possible that he would win the Vuelta-Tour Double.

Hinault steadily chipped away at Zoetemelk's lead and then steadily built his lead over Zoetemelk while all other GC contenders were distanced further and further. Zoetemelk was able to drop Hinault on Alpe d'Huez and claim the stage win. He was able to take back just under a minute, but he needed to win by +3:00.

In the end Hinault would keep the lead and he and Zoetemelk finished nearly a half hour ahead of the rest of the field as Zoetemelk refused to give up and attacked on the final stage into Paris. It was not enough to break Hinault however as he took 2nd place on the podium for the 5th time.

The following year he was riding with a new team in TI–Raleigh, who was one of the strongest cycling teams in the world and they grew even stronger after signing Zoetemelk. At one point in this Tour TI–Raleigh won seven stages in a row, one of which was an ITT won by Zoetemelk where he gained 1:39 on Hinault and pulled within 0:21 of the overall lead prior to the first stages in the high mountains. Hinault withdrew and Zoetemelk remained the strongest rider in the Tour despite suffering a violent crash on Stage 16 which cut his arm and leg open. He would also claim another stage win during the final ITT winning the 1980 Tour de France by nearly 7:00 over Hennie Kuiper and Raymond Martin.

In 1981 he would finish 4th overall and he would finish 2nd for the 6th and final time during the 1982 Tour de France. While he was in his late 30s during his final Tours between 1982–1986 and was no longer a pre-race favorite he still remained the strongest GC general classification rider on his team and always had a respectable placing in the overall standings. Including in his final Tour, which he rode wearing the rainbow jersey as reigning World Champion and late in his career he was still good enough to win major races including the 1985 World Championship, Tirreno–Adriatico and the Amstel Gold Race.

Going into the 1985 World Championship the primary favorites were thought to include Bernard Hinault, Greg LeMond and being as it was thought the course could produce a sprint finish riders like Sean Kelly or even defending world champion Claude Criquielion. There were several early breakaways, but none of them included any riders considered threats to stay away and never extended their gap much beyond two minutes. There were two major crashes, both of which Zoetemelk managed to avoid but the second crash on lap 12 (of 18) allowed a breakaway to form with five riders including Jens Veggerby, Dominique Arnaud and Johan van der Velde. This group built up a gap of over two minutes before the surviving peloton began reeling them back in. Hinault had an off day, suffered a flat tire and abandoned the race, as did several other strong riders including Hennie Kuiper, Dietrich Thurau and Urs Freuler. By lap 17 the race had come back together and riders such as Moreno Argentin, Australian Michael Wilson and Criquielion had launched attacks but before long they had been brought back. By the final lap Zoetemelk had been all but invisible within the pack no different than many other riders, but he was still in the race as riders like Stephen Roche of Ireland and Kim Andersen of Denmark launched attacks that were eventually brought back. Following the final climb there were less than 20 riders still in contention, but it was a very strong surviving group that was going to come down to a sprint finish with riders including former champs LeMond and Criquielion, as well as Andersen, Roche, Robert Millar, Marc Madiot, Italian riders Argentin and Claudio Corti, who finished 2nd the previous year, as well as three Dutch riders in Zoetemelk, Van der Velde and Gerard Veldscholten. Knowing he would not win a sprint against the youngest, strongest riders in the world he launched an attack with over a kilometer to go. Going into the second to last turn Zoetemelk got to the front of the group, moved all the way to the outside of the road then swept back along the inside charging forward into the straightaway. Perhaps, as he was by far the oldest rider in the group and considered long past his prime, his attack caught the surviving contenders by surprise and he quickly opened a gap of fifty meters. His teammates in Van der Velde and Veldscholten moved to the front of the group, but we're not actually chasing Zoetemelk down and were therefore slowing the chase group. As he went under the flamme rouge banner he had a gap of over 300 meters and was continuing to pull away from the best riders in the world. With 400 meters to go in the race he had a gap of 500 meters and Argentin was at the front of the pack trying to bring back Zoetemelk's attack but couldn't, so he actually put his arm in the air and waved for someone else to come forward and help. No one did, including LeMond who stated after the race that he just wasn't strong enough to bring back this final attack after chasing down the attacks of other riders all day long. As the finish line approached he looked over his shoulder one final time and began celebrating. He crossed the line with his hands in the air and as his teammates Van der Velde and Veldscholten crossed the line in 9th and 14th place, they too threw their hands in the air in celebration. As of 2020 Zoetemelk is still the oldest world champion in the history of this event and of the other top 10 finishers in the 1985 race all of them were between 24 and 28 years old.

Regarding his victory in the 1980 Tour de France, Peter Post, directeur sportif of the  team in the Netherlands, approached Zoetemelk through his wife, Françoise, after the world championship in 1979. Zoetemelk had long lived in France and ridden for French teams. His sponsor, the bicycle company Mercier, had ended its sponsorship and Zoetemelk was looking for a new team. The following year Zoetemelk won his – and 's – only Tour de France. The pre-race favourite, Bernard Hinault had retired halfway due to knee-problems. Zoetemelk objected to claims that he had won only because Hinault had dropped out, saying: "Surely winning the Tour de France is a question of health and robustness. If Hinault doesn't have that health and robustness and I have, that makes me a valid winner."

Gerald O'Donovan, the  director behind sponsorship of the team, said:

"We needed a winner and for 1980 signed Joop Zoetemelk, who had an outstanding record of places but had probably enjoyed less support than we could give him. We cleaned up the Tours of Belgium, Holland and Critérium du Dauphiné Libéré in preparation and waited for the big day. The big plan to control Bernard Hinault, who had won for the previous two years, came to fruition. The team attacked his every move; this was Panzer Group Post at its most formidable. About halfway through the race he abandoned the lead to Zoetemelk and pulled out of the race. We arrived in Paris with the overall lead, 12 stage wins and the team prize, to say nothing of a whole bundle of francs. We had pounded away winning the battles for the previous four years; at last we had won the war."

Of one-day races he won La Flèche Wallonne in 1976, and the Grand Prix d'Automne in 1977 and 1979. He came in fourth in the World Championships of 1976 & 1982, and placed in the top 10 in 1972, 1973, 1975, 1978 and 1984 before winning in 1985. Of the major week long stage races he won Tirreno–Adriatico, the Tour de Romandie and three editions of Paris–Nice. While he was never victorious in the Critérium du Dauphiné Libéré, he did place in the top 10 on eight occasions.

In 18 years as a professional (1969–1987), Zoetemelk had a remarkable record of consistency. In grand tours and major stage races he entered 57 races, completing 55 of them, or 96.5% of them. Of these 55 completed races he finished inside the top 10 thirty-eight times, made the podium twenty-one times and claimed seven victories. He only finished outside the top 25 on four occasions.

He entered the Tour de France sixteen times and finished the race sixteen times, the latter of which is a record that Sylvain Chavanel tied when he finished the 2018 Tour de France. He holds the record for total kilometers ridden, a record that will be very difficult to break as modern stages are considerably shorter than they were during Zoetemelk's era. Another record he held was for the most stages completed in TDF history with 365, a record that was not broken until 2018 by Chavanel.

Doping

During the 1977 Tour de France he won the mountain time trial on stage 15B, but a few days later it was revealed he took a banned substance and had this stage win revoked and was penalized ten minutes.

In the 1979 Tour de France Zoetemelk tried attacking Hinault on the final stage of the race into Paris. Hinault and Zoetemelk stayed away for the entire stage and Zoetemelk was given a ten-minute doping penalty after the race was over.

During the 1983 Tour de France he was given a doping penalty. He was no longer a favorite for victory at this stage in his career and was not taking substances for "performance enhancement", but just to "survive" the race. Much later it was revealed by riders from this era that oftentimes they would take substances just to survive the race.

He was not implicated during his Tour win in 1980.

Assessment

Zoetemelk is one of the most successful Tour riders of all time; he finished second a record six times and won once. His career coincided with the rise and fall of both Eddy Merckx and Bernard Hinault, riders considered by many to be the #1 and #2 in all of Tour de France history. While Merckx was rivaled by Luis Ocaña and Hinault by Laurent Fignon and Greg LeMond, by the end of most of their Tour victories it was Zoetemelk who proved to be the only rider in the entire field capable of keeping either one of them within striking distance. Specifically in Merckx's 1969 and 1970 Tour wins nobody was able to keep him within fifteen minutes in 1969 and in 1970 Zoetemelk was the only rider to do so. He also finished 2nd to Merckx in 1971 following Ocana's infamous crash on the Col de Menté, a crash in which Zoetemelk was involved but somehow managed to avoid injury. In fact, early in the 1971 Tour de France Zoetemelk wore the Yellow Jersey for the first time becoming the first GC contender to take the Yellow from Merckx. Then in the 1979 Hinault victory nearly the entire field finished a half hour or more behind him, but Zoetemelk was able to keep him within about three minutes to finish in second place, becoming the only rider in Tour history to challenge the yellow jersey on the final stage into Paris in the process. Zoetemelk finished second to Hinault in 1978 and 1979, before outlasting and defeating him in 1980, and again during his sixth and final second-place finish in 1982.

During his remarkable career Zoetemelk spent 22 days in the Yellow Jersey and won 10 individual stages in the Tour de France, was the overall winner of the Vuelta a España in 1979, the King of the Mountains in 1971, and won the 1985 UCI Road World Championships.

A fellow Tour rider, Rini Wagtmans, said: "Joop Zoetemelk is the best rider that the Netherlands has ever known. There has never been a better one. But he could not give instructions. He was treated and helped with respect. But when Zoetemelk won the Tour, the instructions had to come from Gerrie Knetemann and Jan Raas."

Peter Post said: "Joop would fit in any team. I've known only a few riders who were so easy. He followed the rules, he got on with people. That's the way he is. He never asked for domestiques. Joop never demanded anything."

Personal life and retirement

After retiring, Zoetemelk became a directeur sportif with Superconfex, which became Rabobank in 1996. Zoetemelk stayed with Rabobank for 10 years, retiring as a directeur sportif and from the sport after the 2006 Vuelta a España.

Zoetemelk married Françoise Duchaussoy, daughter of the Tour de France executive, Jacques Duchaussoy. They owned and ran the Richemont hotel in Meaux, near Paris. Their son, Karl, was a French mountain bike rider and champion.

Recognition
Joop Zoetemelk was the second Dutch winner of the Tour de France after Jan Janssen. The Dutch cycling federation, the KNWU, named Zoetemelk the best Dutch rider of all time at a gala to mark its 75th anniversary. A statue of him at Rijpwetering, where he grew up, was unveiled on 31 May 2005. He was named sportsman of the year in the Netherlands in 1980 and 1985. Between 1972 and 1985, he won the Gerrit Schulte Trophy nine times as best rider of the year, more than anybody else in Dutch professional racing.
The Joop Zoetemelk Classic, a cyclo-sportive over 45, 75 or 150 km, is held every March, organised by the Swift club of which Zoetemelk is a member. The course passes his statue.

Career achievements

Major results

1968
 1st  Overall Ronde van Midden-Zeeland
1st Stage 1
 1st  Team time trial, Olympic Games
1969
 1st  Overall Circuit de Lorraine
1st Stage 1a
 1st  Overall Tour de l'Avenir
 3rd Overall Tour of Austria
1st Stage 2b, 3 & 6
1970
 1st Stage 2b Paris–Luxembourg
 2nd Overall Tour de France
 2nd Rund um den Henninger Turm
 3rd Overall Tour de Romandie
 4th Overall Tour de Luxembourg
 5th Brabantse Pijl
 7th Overall Critérium du Dauphiné Libéré
 8th Overall Vuelta a Andalucía
1971
 1st  Road race, National Road Championships 
 2nd Overall Tour de France
 2nd Overall Grand Prix du Midi Libre
 2nd Grand Prix des Nations
 4th Overall Tour de Luxembourg
1st Stage 4b
 4th La Flèche Wallonne
 6th Overall Vuelta a España
1st  Mountains classification
1st Stage 16
 9th Brabantse Pijl
1972
 1st Trophée des Grimpeurs
 2nd Road race, National Road Championships 
 2nd Overall Grand Prix du Midi Libre
 2nd Grand Prix des Nations
 3rd Overall Tour of Belgium
 3rd Overall À travers Lausanne
 3rd Amstel Gold Race
 4th Overall Tour de la Nouvelle-France
 5th Overall Tour de France
 5th Road race, UCI Road World Championships
 6th Giro di Lombardia
 10th Overall Paris–Nice
1973
 1st  Road race, National Road Championships
 1st Tour du Haut Var
 1st Stage 1a Escalada a Montjuïc
 2nd Overall Grand Prix du Midi Libre
1st Stage 1a & 2
 2nd Overall Grand Prix de Fourmies
 2nd Trophée des Grimpeurs
 3rd Overall Critérium du Dauphiné Libéré
1st Stage 2b
 3rd Overall Paris–Nice
1st Stage 7b (ITT)
 3rd Overall Four Days of Dunkirk
 3rd Grand Prix des Nations
 4th Overall Tour de France
1st  Combination classification
1st Prologue & Stage 4
 4th Amstel Gold Race
 5th Road race, UCI Road World Championships
 5th Tour of Flanders
 9th Liège–Bastogne–Liège
1974
 1st  Overall Paris–Nice
1st Stages 6a (ITT) & 7b (ITT)
 1st  Overall Tour de Romandie
1st Stage 4
 1st  Overall Setmana Catalana de Ciclisme
1st Stage 5
 1st Stage 2 Étoile de Bessèges
 9th Overall Tour Méditerranéen
1st Stage 2 
1975
 1st  Overall Paris–Nice
1st Stages 6a (ITT) & 7b (ITT)
 1st  Overall Ronde van Nederland
1st Stage 4
 1st  Overall À travers Lausanne
1st Stage 1
 1st Grand Prix d'Isbergues
 2nd Overall Grand Prix du Midi Libre
 2nd Overall Escalada a Montjuïc
1st Stage 1b 
 2nd Road race, National Road Championships
 2nd Grand Prix des Nations
 3rd Overall Critérium du Dauphiné Libéré
 3rd Overall Setmana Catalana de Ciclisme
 4th Overall Tour de France
1st Stage 11
 5th Road race, UCI Road World Championships
 6th Grand Prix of Aargau Canton
 7th Critérium des As
 8th La Flèche Wallonne
1976
 1st  Overall À travers Lausanne
1st Stages 1 & 2
 1st La Flèche Wallonne
 1st Grand Prix Le Télégramme
 2nd Overall Tour de France
1st Stage 9, 10 & 20
 2nd Overall Escalada a Montjuïc
1st Stage 1a 
 3rd Grand Prix des Nations
 4th Overall Tour Méditerranéen
 4th Road race, UCI Road World Championships
 4th Road race, National Road Championships
 4th Giro di Lombardia
 6th Amstel Gold Race
 8th Overall Critérium du Dauphiné Libéré
1st Stage 3 
 8th Overall Paris–Nice
 9th Overall Grand Prix du Midi Libre
 10th Liège–Bastogne–Liège
 10th E3 Prijs Vlaanderen
 10th Grand Prix de Wallonie
1977
 1st  Overall À travers Lausanne
1st Stages 1 & 2
 1st Paris–Tours
 1st Grand Prix d'Isbergues
 1st Stage 2a Tour de l'Aude
 2nd Overall Tour de Romandie
 2nd Grand Prix des Nations
 2nd Trofeo Baracchi (with Freddy Maertens)
 3rd Overall Volta a Catalunya
1st Stage 4a (ITT)
 3rd Overall Grand Prix du Midi Libre
 7th Overall Critérium du Dauphiné Libéré
 7th Giro di Lombardia
 8th Overall Tour de France
1978
 1st  Overall À travers Lausanne
1st Stages 1 & 2 (ITT)
 1st Paris–Camembert
 1st Gran Premio di Lugano
 2nd Overall Tour de France
1st Stage 14 (ITT)
 2nd Tour du Haut Var
 2nd GP Ouest-France
 2nd Grand Prix de Monaco
 2nd Trofeo Baracchi (with Hennie Kuiper)
 3rd Overall Paris–Nice
1st Stage 1 (victory shared with Gerrie Knetemann)
 3rd Amstel Gold Race
 3rd Grand Prix Le Télégramme
 4th Overall Critérium du Dauphiné Libéré
 4th Overall Ronde van Nederland
 4th Paris–Tours
 4th Critérium des As
 4th Grand Prix des Nations
 6th Overall Critérium International
1st Stage 2 
 6th Overall Grand Prix du Midi Libre
 6th Overall Four Days of Dunkirk
 6th Road race, UCI Road World Championships
 7th Road race, National Road Championships
 7th Giro di Lombardia
 7th La Flèche Wallonne
1979
 1st  Overall Vuelta a España
1st Prologue & Stage 8b (ITT)
 1st  Overall Paris–Nice
1st Stage 7b (ITT)
 1st  Overall Critérium International
1st Stage 2
 1st  Overall À travers Lausanne
1st Stages 1 & 2 (ITT)
 1st Tour du Haut Var
 1st Paris–Tours
 1st Critérium des As
 1st Prologue Critérium du Dauphiné Libéré
 1st Stage 5a Ronde van Nederland
 1st Stage 3 Étoile de Bessèges
 2nd Overall Tour de France
1st Stage 18
 2nd Road race, National Road Championships
 3rd Overall Escalada a Montjuïc
 3rd Grand Prix des Nations
 4th Paris–Roubaix
 5th Amstel Gold Race
 7th La Flèche Wallonne
 10th Tour of Flanders
 10th Paris–Brussels
1980
 1st  Overall  Tour de France
1st Stage 1b (TTT), 7a (TTT), 11 (ITT) & 20 (ITT)
 1st Critérium des As
 1st Grand Prix Pino Cerami
 1st Stage 5 Tour de Romandie
 1st Stage 1a (ITT) Escalada a Montjuïc
 3rd Overall Tour de Suisse
 4th Druivenkoers Overijse
 5th Overall Tour de Romandie
1st Stage 5 
 9th Overall Critérium du Dauphiné Libéré
1st Prologue 
 10th La Flèche Wallonne
1981
 1st  Overall Escalada a Montjuïc
1st Stages 1b & 1c  
 1st Grand Prix Pino Cerami
 4th Overall Tour de France
1st Stage 1b (TTT) & 4 (TTT)
 4th Overall Ronde van Nederland
1982
 2nd Overall Tour de France
 2nd Overall Étoile des Espoirs
 2nd Overall Escalada a Montjuïc
1st Stage 1b (ITT)
 3rd Road race, National Road Championships
 4th Road race, UCI Road World Championships
 6th Overall Tour Midi-Pyrénées
 7th Overall Grand Prix du Midi Libre
 10th Overall Tour de l'Aude
1983
 1st Tour du Haut Var
 1st Stage 2 (TTT) Tour de France
 2nd Overall Grand Prix du Midi Libre
 2nd Overall Tour Méditerranéen
 3rd Overall Critérium International
 4th Overall Paris–Nice
 6th La Flèche Wallonne
1984
 2nd Overall Tour de l'Aude
 9th Overall Tirreno–Adriatico
 9th Liège–Bastogne–Liège
 9th Circuit des Frontières
 10th Road race, UCI Road World Championships
1985
 1st  Road race, UCI Road World Championships
 1st  Overall Tirreno–Adriatico
1st Stage 5 (ITT)
 1st Veenendaal–Veenendaal
 2nd Grand Prix de Wallonie
 3rd Overall Escalada a Montjuïc
 4th Overall Tour de Romandie
 4th Overall Tour de l'Aude
 4th Critérium des As
 5th Overall Tour Méditerranéen
 7th Overall Critérium International
 7th Grand Prix d'Isbergues
 8th Grand Prix de Cannes
1986
 2nd Amstel Gold Race
 3rd Overall Critérium du Dauphiné Libéré
 4th Overall Tour of Sweden
 5th Overall Tour Méditerranéen
 6th La Flèche Wallonne
 8th Grand Prix d'Isbergues
1987
 1st Amstel Gold Race
 2nd Overall Escalada a Montjuïc
 8th Critérium des As
 10th Overall Four Days of Dunkirk

Grand Tour general classification results timeline

Major Stage Race results timeline

Major championship results timeline

See also
 List of Dutch cyclists who have led the Tour de France general classification
 List of Dutch Olympic cyclists

References

External links

 
 
 

1946 births
Cyclists at the 1968 Summer Olympics
Doping cases in cycling
Dutch sportspeople in doping cases
Dutch male cyclists
Dutch Tour de France stage winners
Dutch Vuelta a España stage winners
Living people
Olympic cyclists of the Netherlands
Olympic gold medalists for the Netherlands
Olympic medalists in cycling
People from Kaag en Braassem
Tour de France prologue winners
Tour de France winners
UCI Road World Champions (elite men)
Vuelta a España winners
Medalists at the 1968 Summer Olympics
UCI Road World Championships cyclists for the Netherlands
Cyclists from South Holland
Dutch expatriate sportspeople in France